Fighting Odds is a 1917 American silent drama film produced and distributed by Goldwyn Pictures and starring stage beauty Maxine Elliott. The film is based on the play Under Sentence by Irvin S. Cobb and Roi Cooper Megrue. The picture was amongst Goldwyn's first productions as an independent producer. It was directed by veteran Allan Dwan and is a surviving film at the Museum of Modern Art, New York, and Gosfilmofond in Russia.

Plot
As described in a film magazine, James Copley (Clive), through his generosity to his employees, wins their confidence and the enmity of John W. Blake (Dalton), known as a breaker of men and fortunes. By making Copley president of Amalgamated Motors Company, Blake succeeds in ruining Copley and sending him to prison. His wife (Elliott) decides to free her husband and put Blake where he belongs. Through the old method of vampiring, Mrs. Copley succeeds in securing the evidence that frees her husband and puts Blake behind bars.

Cast
William T. Carleton as District Attorney
Henry Clive as Mr. Copley
Charles Dalton as John W. Blake
Maxine Elliott as Mrs. Copley
Eric Hudson as Detective Butler
Regan Hughston as Jewett
George Odell as Egan

References

External links

Lantern slide (Wayback Machine)
Lobby cards at moviestillsdb.com

1917 films
American silent feature films
Films directed by Allan Dwan
American films based on plays
Goldwyn Pictures films
1917 drama films
American black-and-white films
Silent American drama films
1910s American films